Heliga korsets kapell (Holy Cross Chapel) is a chapel associated with the assembly of Ängelholm  in the diocese of Lund. The chapel is located on the cemetery of Ängelholms church in the north part of central Ängelholm. The cemetery was opened in 1887 and was originally called the new, or, north cemetery.

The church building 
The chapel with a crematorium was built after drawings by the provincial architect Nils A. Blanck and was finished in 1956. An extension was added in 1986 after the drawings of the architect Lennart Hansson. Another extension to the chapel and crematorium was added in 2004 after the drawings of the architect Sulev Krämer.

The church choir wall has a fresco of Jesus Christ made by Pär Siegård.

References 

 Åsbo Släkt- och Folklivsforskare
 Svenska kyrkan i Ängelholm
 Förslövs Socken Förr och Nu

Churches in the Diocese of Lund
Religious buildings and structures completed in 1956